"Smart & Smarter" is the thirteenth episode of the fifteenth season of the American animated television series The Simpsons. It originally aired on the Fox network in the United States on February 22, 2004. When Maggie takes an IQ test, she is informed that she may be smarter than Lisa, who worries that her life will go nowhere. The episode was written by Carolyn Omine and directed by Steven Dean Moore. Simon Cowell also has a guest-voice appearance, playing the role of a brutally honest judge (who in fact is shown as a caricature of himself).

Plot
The family visits Wickerbottom's Pre-Nursery School, where Apu and Manjula are sending two of their octuplets. Homer and Marge have a talk with Dr. Hibbert about getting in, and decide to have Maggie go in. However, Maggie fails the initial screening because she cannot talk, until Lisa discovers some traits of intelligence. Henry accepts Maggie after the second screening. The results show that not only is Maggie brilliant, but her IQ of 167 is higher than Lisa's IQ of 159. Lisa is no longer considered "the smart one" of the Simpson family, much to her chagrin. Lisa attempts to prove everyone that she is smarter than Maggie and teaches Maggie false information. However, Marge, realizing this, scolds her for trying to sabotage her sister's education and that if that is how she really feels, then she should not be her sister's role model.

Heartbroken, Lisa leaves the house and hides in the Natural History Museum, where there is no chance of Homer and Marge finding her, until Chief Wiggum, Lou and Eddie find her belongings in there. The family goes into the human body exhibit, but Maggie gets distracted and accidentally presses the swallow button, swallowing Homer, Marge and Bart. Maggie presses many buttons until she finally presses the evacuate button, following a visual cue from an apologetic Lisa as to its red color.

After the family returns home and wonders why Maggie did not press the red button first, Henry arrives and tells the family Maggie is no longer welcome at the school. The family watches a video tape of Maggie's audition and it turns out Lisa was showing her answers, which Lisa does not remember doing, but it is explained she subconsciously did that as she wanted Maggie to succeed. Henry starts criticizing Maggie which leads an angry Homer to start punching him, while Henry criticizes his punches until he is knocked unconscious.

In the end, Lisa assures Maggie she does not care what anyone else thinks of her and that she is brilliant to her. However, Maggie plays Lisa's saxophone perfectly, showing another sign of intelligence. A shocked Lisa reclaims her saxophone and tells her that it is "not for babies".

In the credits, Simon Cowell criticizes everyone who had worked on the show.

Cultural references
The episode's title is a reference to the 1994 film, Dumb and Dumber. In this episode, Henry quotes, "She's as common as an angry woman in an Ibsen play," perhaps referencing Nora in A Doll's House. The revelation that Maggie is only smart because she is watching Lisa is similar to the case of Clever Hans at the turn of the century.  During the second interview Henry calls Maggie "Pippi Nontalking", which is reference to the character Pippi Longstocking. Maggie as a genius talking through the phonics frog perhaps is a reference to Stephen Hawking communicating through his computer.

Marge's line "All our children are smart. Some are just smarter than others" is a reference to Animal Farm's "All animals are equal, but some animals are more equal than others." Marge giving Lisa the paper quoting "You are Lisa Simpson" is a reference to the season two episode, "Lisa's Substitute", where the character Mr. Bergstrom gave her a similar paper - which Lisa shows framed next to her bed. Lisa's black and white nightmare of her pushing Maggie down the stairs in a wheelchair is a reference to the 1962 film What Ever Happened to Baby Jane?.

Lisa staying in the Natural History Museum is a reference to the book From the Mixed-Up Files of Mrs. Basil E. Frankweiler, in which kids ran away from home and lived in the Metropolitan Museum of Art in New York City. The instrumental version of the song playing during the scenes where Lisa is walking around the museum is "Moon River" from the film Breakfast at Tiffany's.

References

External links 
 

The Simpsons (season 15) episodes
2004 American television episodes
Television episodes written by Carolyn Omine